The La Garita Wilderness is a U.S. Wilderness Area located in the La Garita Mountains of southern  Colorado.  The  wilderness established in 1964 in Gunnison and Rio Grande National Forests includes segments of the Colorado Trail and the Continental Divide Trail. At , San Luis Peak is the highest point in the wilderness area.

One entrance to the wilderness area is via Forest Road 787 from Saguache Park and Cochetopa Park off State Highway 114 west of Saguache, Colorado. There is a parking lot for visitors to the wilderness area at the south end of FS 787. Cochetopa Park may also be entered from the east over Cochetopa Pass via Saguache County Road NN14.

References

Wilderness areas of Colorado
Gunnison National Forest
Rio Grande National Forest
San Juan Mountains (Colorado)
Protected areas of Hinsdale County, Colorado
Protected areas of Saguache County, Colorado
Protected areas of Mineral County, Colorado
Protected areas established in 1964
1964 establishments in Colorado